Giannini is a surname of Italian origin. The name refers to:

Adriano Giannini (born 1971), Italian actor
Amadeo Giannini (1870–1949), Italian-American banker; founder of Bank of America
Dusolina Giannini (1902–1986), Italian-American opera soprano
Eli Giannini (born 1956) Australian architect
Ettore Giannini (1912–1990), Italian screenwriter and film director
Frida Giannini (born 1972), Italian fashion designer
Giancarlo Giannini (born 1942), Italian actor
Giuseppe Giannini (born 1964), Italian professional football player
Humberto Giannini (1927–2014), Chilean philosopher
Joe Giannini (1888–1942), American professional baseball player
John Giannini (born 1962), American college basketball coach
Margaret Giannini (1921–2021), American physician, government official
Stefania Giannini (born 1960), current Italian Minister of Education, Universities and Research
Tula Giannini, American academic and musicologist
Vittorio Giannini (1903–1966), American composer

See also
 Giannini musical instrument maker

Italian-language surnames
Patronymic surnames
Surnames from given names